Mathias Porseland (born 12 June 1986) is a Swedish professional ice hockey defenceman. He is currently a free agent having last played for HC Dynamo Pardubice of the Czech Extraliga.

Career statistics

Regular season and playoffs

External links

1986 births
Living people
Admiral Vladivostok players
Bofors IK players
Brynäs IF players
HC Dynamo Pardubice players
Frölunda HC players
HPK players
HC Lev Praha players
HC Litvínov players
Rögle BK players
Ice hockey people from Gothenburg
Swedish ice hockey defencemen
HC Vityaz players
GKS Katowice (ice hockey) players
HC TWK Innsbruck players
Swedish expatriate ice hockey players in Finland
Swedish expatriate sportspeople in the Czech Republic
Swedish expatriate sportspeople in Russia
Swedish expatriate sportspeople in Poland
Swedish expatriate sportspeople in Austria
Expatriate ice hockey players in Austria
Expatriate ice hockey players in Poland
Expatriate ice hockey players in Russia